Polycomb-group proteins (PcG proteins) are a family of protein complexes first discovered in fruit flies that can remodel chromatin such that epigenetic silencing of genes takes place. Polycomb-group proteins are well known for silencing Hox genes through modulation of chromatin structure during embryonic development in fruit flies (Drosophila melanogaster). They derive their name from the fact that the first sign of a decrease in PcG function is often a homeotic transformation of posterior legs towards anterior legs, which have a characteristic comb-like set of bristles.

In insects 
In Drosophila, the Trithorax-group (trxG) and Polycomb-group (PcG) proteins act antagonistically and interact with chromosomal elements, termed Cellular Memory Modules (CMMs). Trithorax-group (trxG) proteins maintain the active state of gene expression while the  Polycomb-group (PcG) proteins counteract this activation with a repressive function that is stable over many cell generations and can only be overcome by germline differentiation processes. Polycomb Gene complexes or PcG silencing consist of at least three kinds of multiprotein complex Polycomb Repressive Complex 1 (PRC1), PRC2 and PhoRC. These complexes work together to carry out their repressive effect. PcGs proteins are evolutionarily conserved and exist in at least two separate protein complexes; the PcG repressive complex 1 (PRC1) and the PcG repressive complex 2–4 (PRC2/3/4). PRC2 catalyzes trimethylation of lysine 27 on histone H3 (H3K27me2/3), while PRC1 mono- ubiquitinates histone H2A on lysine 119 (H2AK119Ub1).

In mammals 
In mammals Polycomb Group gene expression is important in many aspects of development like homeotic gene regulation and X chromosome inactivation, being recruited to the inactive X by Xist RNA, the master regulator of XCI or embryonic stem cell self-renewal. The Bmi1 polycomb ring finger protein promotes neural stem cell self-renewal. Murine null mutants in PRC2 genes are embryonic lethals while most PRC1 mutants are live born homeotic mutants that die perinatally. In contrast overexpression of PcG proteins correlates with the severity and invasiveness of several cancer types. The mammalian PRC1 core complexes are very similar to Drosophila. Polycomb Bmi1 is known to regulate ink4 locus (p16Ink4a, p19Arf).

Regulation of Polycomb-group proteins at bivalent chromatin sites is performed by SWI/SNF complexes, which oppose the accumulation of Polycomb complexes through ATP-dependent eviction.

In plants 
In Physcomitrella patens the PcG protein FIE is specifically expressed in stem cells such as the unfertilized egg cell. Soon after fertilisation the FIE gene is inactivated in the young embryo. The Polycomb gene FIE is expressed in unfertilised egg cells of the moss Physcomitrella patens and expression ceases after fertilisation in the developing diploid sporophyte.

It has been shown that unlike in mammals the PcG are necessary to keep the cells in a differentiated state. Consequently, loss of PcG causes de-differentiation and promotes embryonic development.

Polycomb-group proteins also intervene in the control of flowering by silencing the Flowering Locus C gene. This gene is a central part of the pathway that inhibits flowering in plants and its silencing during winter is suspected to be one of the main factors intervening in plant vernalization.

See also 
 PRC1
 PRC2
 PHC1
 PHC2
 Heterochromatin protein 1 (Cbx)
 BMI1
PCGF1, KDM2B
 PCGF2 (Polycomb group RING finger protein 2) ortolog Bmi1
 RYBP
 RING1
 SUV39H1 (histone-lysine N-methyltransferase)
 L3mbtl2
 EZH2 (Enhancer of Zeste Homolog 2) 
 EED
 SUZ12 (Suppressor of Zeste 12)
 Jarid2 (jumonji, AT rich interactive domain 2) 
 RE1-silencing transcription factor (REST)
 RNF2
 CBFβ
 YY1
 Bivalent chromatin

References

Further reading

External links 
 
 The Polycomb and Trithorax page of the Cavalli lab This page contains useful information on Polycomb and trithorax proteins, in the form of an introduction, links to published reviews, list of Polycomb and trithorax proteins, illustrative power point slides and a link to a genome browser showing the genome-wide distribution of these proteins in Drosophila melanogaster.
 Drosophila Genes in Development: Polycomb-group in the Homeobox Genes DataBase
 Chromatin organization and the Polycomb and Trithorax groups in The Interactive Fly
 

Protein families
Drosophila melanogaster genes
Nuclear organization